Josef Hampl (17 April 1932 Prague - 25 March 2019) was a Czech collage artist, painter, sculptor, printmaker and creator of land art projects. He is one of the founders of Czech abstract art. As a world-famous author of the original technique of sewn collages, he is represented in many foreign collections.

Biography

Early life and education
He was born in Prague on 17 April 1932, into a family of a tailor and an amateur painter. After finishing school, he began apprenticing in his father's workshop, but the communist regime abolished virtually all trades during the 1950s. Josef Hampl was given the choice between working in mines, steelworks or in the engineering industry. Eventually he found a job as a metalworker at the Praga factory in Vysočany. Here, after his work shift, he used an art studio where employees could paint or model under the guidance of external teachers.

At an exhibition at the factory trade union club in 1959, he met Vladimír Boudník, who was employed at the neighbouring Aero factory. In addition to Vladimír Boudník, Lubomír Přibyl also worked in the same factory and after being expelled from the Academy in 1959, he found employment there in the promotional department. Boudník introduced Hampl to his graphic techniques and got him acquainted with Bohumil Hrabal and Jiří Kolář. The Vysočany Circle, which Oldřich Hamera joined in the mid-1960s, is a unique phenomenon in the history of modern Czech art. The inspiring thought environment of the strong personalities of Boudník, Hrabal and Kolář, as well as the everyday raw reality of factory work, marked a turning point in the aesthetic understanding and technical processing of artistic artefacts.

In 1955-1960 Josef Hampl studied at the private School of Decorative Arts in Prague under Prof. Jaroslav Masák and with sculptor Ivan Lošák from the Prague Ukrainian Academy. He also attended evening lectures on art history at the Václav Hollar Art School (prof. J. Wage) and participated in plein-air painting in South Bohemia with other students. Books on modern art were lent to him by Jiří Kolář, who was also his first critic and collector. He could not consider studying properly at art school in the 1950s because he came from a family of tradesmen. After leaving the army he was also prevented from studying by concern for his family.

As an independent artist
Josef Hampl has been exhibiting independently since 1964. During the temporary relaxation of the regime in the second half of the 1960s, he was offered a job as an assistant in the graphic workshop of the Academy of Fine Arts in Prague, which served the studios of Prof. Vojtěch Tittelbach, Ladislav Čepelák and Jiří John. After the Warsaw Pact invasion of Czechoslovakia he survived here the entire period of normalization. While in Czechoslovakia he exhibited only in small unofficial galleries, throughout the 1970s and 1980s he was invited to graphic art shows around the world and became well known in Belgium, Germany, Austria, Spain, Italy, Hungary, France, Poland, Japan and the United States. Since the late 1960s, he has also worked inconsistently as a sculptor and has carried out 30 events and installations in outdoor and indoor settings. Since the 1970s he has participated in Mail art projects worldwide.

By 2017 he had 84 solo exhibitions in the Czech Republic and participated in 600 group exhibitions, 380 of which were abroad. After 2000 he worked in his studio in the countryside for most of the year and then settled there in 2009. He was a member of the art department of the Umělecká beseda, the free association Papirial and the Künstlergilde in Germany.

Awards 
 23rd Vladimír Boudník Award for significant creative contribution to Czech graphic art (2017)

Work 
In the 1950s, Josef Hampl learned realistic painting and tried various printmaking techniques (drypoint, linocut, woodcut). His acquaintance with Vladimír Boudník influenced his further work. In 1959-1962, he worked with structural and active graphics and made blind prints from relief matrices (Active print, 1959). In his abstract structural paintings he used, for example, found scratches of industrial synthetic paints or sand with synthetic binder as relief elements (Slow Catastrophe, 1963, Blue Unrest, 1965). His work from the first half of the 1960s is characterized by a creative search and exploration of other artistic means in an attempt to counter and overcome the strong impulse of Boudník's graphic work.

In 1964-1965, circular motifs as symbols of the planets predominate in his graphic sheets, created using a variety of techniques. The paintings have dark colours and usually combine structural graphics with relief painting or assemblage (Space of Silence, 1965). He also created a series of prints using frottage calligraphic script from old Jewish tombstones (Kafka, monofrottage, 1969). The need for a fixed order gradually prevailed in his works, and in a series of so-called counter-types from the late 1960s, he combined abstract monotypes with regular grids created using stencils.

At the beginning of the 1970s, Hampl's work developed under the sign of a "new sensibility", shaped by signal colours and working with purely geometric elements. His drawings from 1974, on the other hand, are minimalist geometric patterns, where the artist makes do only with red lines bordered by black lines. Offset black and white prints on canvas and monochrome geometric relief patterns from 1976-1977 already partly anticipate some of the sewn collages of the 1980s in their arrangement. Hampl's geometric compositions, with their meditative quality, break out of the classical tendencies of concrete art of the time.

The period of normalization was characterised by various private happenings and conceptual art events in nature (R. Němec, E. Brikcius, I. Kafka, J. Beránek). In 1976, Josef Hampl, in collaboration with his third wife, the photographer Hana Hamplová, created a series of spatial installations using long strips of organdy, called Action arrow. In the 1980s he continued these activities (Games with a Cube, 1982, Crossing, 1983, Chmelnice Mutějovice, 1983, Labyrinth, 1984, Stairway to Heaven, 1985).

In the graphic sheets and pencil drawings combined with frottage and perforation (Horizontal Structure - Dialogue, 1980, Hatching 22, 1980), the consistent horizontal arrangement of the composition that is characteristic of the first sewn paper collages (Layering with Blue, 1984) and the black and white drawings combined with sewing from the mid-1980s already appears. The very title of the entire large-scale series, The Unpredictible Games (1982-1987), with its concentrated meditative symbolism of subtly rhythmic patterns, speaks to the sensitivity and vulnerability of the human soul and nature. The simple drawing patterns combined with tufts of loose black threads, which are a continuation of the drawing in space, give a pure and fragile impression of Japanese calligraphy on the white canvas, divided by horizontal stitched black lines. The large-scale works to be hung between two round pieces of wood, kept in a roll, are in principle actually Japanese Kakemona i.e. a hanging thing or Kakejiku - a hanging scroll.

The combination of the constructivist arrangement of the pictorial surface with the regular horizontal grid created by sewing became a completely new and original contribution of Josef Hampl to the technique of collage itself. Some of the works are monumental in size (Synthesis, 300 x 640 cm, 1985, Wedge Landscape, Wedge of Landscape, object 800 x 400 x 300 cm, 1988). In later years, the artist used materials that contrast in colour or texture to create collages. In addition to various kinds of handmade papers, whose aesthetic effect lies in the changing surface texture and irregular composition of the matrix, he uses the contrast of the absolute blackness of angular punched papers, scraps of photographs, colored posters, tailor's cuts, used tea bags, wasps' nests, etc. Instead of sewing, he sometimes attaches scraps of paper with paper clips, which then act as linear drawings (Horizontal EPP 2, 2000) or create autonomous dynamic patterns (Probe - Lung, 1999, Finding, 2004).

In some collages, the principle of free layering of diverse structures prevails, in others a strict geometric order and interpenetration of surfaces and spatial plans. In an extensive series Roušky - Veils (1990-1991), the vertical axis of the collage contrasts with the edges in its structure or colour, and the deliberate asymmetry of the drawing brings a dynamic element to the quiet composition. The individual collages form an interconnected whole, but Hampl's artistic inventiveness makes each of them unique and unrepeatable. The colours of the collages are muted thanks to the raw materials used, and apart from white and black, red is usually used as a colour accent. During his scholarship in the United states in 1992, Josef Hampl collected printed and handwritten calligraphic posters in New York's Chinatown, from which he created an aesthetically and content-wise interesting set of collages in 1997, which reflect the bizarre atmosphere and energy of the place (Chinatown New York, 1997).

Hampl's collages, prints and drawings have always displayed a delicate tenderness and at the same time a rationality of constructivist tendencies close to a "new sensibility". He is one of the witnesses of the messianic role of art, which Vladimír Boudník came up with. He understood art as creative work, as an exploration of an entrusted field, a claim, a symbolic space, which he explored systematically to the last detail and in all its conceivable nuances.

Representation in collections 
(Listed in: Josef Hampl, Šité kresby a koláže / Sewn drawings and collages, Gallery, Prague 2007, p. 9)
 National Gallery in Prague
 Centre Pompidou, Paris
 Art Gallery Karlovy Vary 
 Ministry of Culture of the Czech Republic
 Moravian Gallery in Brno
 Graphiksammlung des XX. Jh., Deutcher Bundestag, Bonn
 Museum für aktuelle Kunst, Utrecht 
 de Warande Culture Centre, Turnhout, Belgium
 Stedelijk Museum, Toroke 
 Staatsgalerie, Stuttgart
 Museum Stucki, Lodz 
 Pratt Graphics Centre, New York
 University of Michigan Museum of Art, Ann Arbor
 
 Museum and Gallery, Hranice na Moravě
 Kassák múzeum és archívum, Budapest
 State Jewish Museum, Prague
 Ostfonds für kulturelle Angelegenheiten des Bundesministeriums für Unterricht und Kunst, Wienna
 
 Collection of the Prague Gas Works

References

Sources

Catalogues (selection) 
 Josef Hampl: Graphics from 1959-1961, Tamchyna Petr, cat. 20 p., Závod Klementa Gottwalda, Vysočany, 1961
 Josef Hampl, text by Hartmann Antonín, cat. 44 p., Galerie Bode Glaub, Cologne, 1970
 Josef Hampl: Works with paper and drawing 1983-85, Pánková Marcela, cat. 2 p., Galerie Opatov 1986
 Josef Hampl: Drawings - Sewing 1982-1986, Pánková Marcela, cat. 24 p., Central Cultural House of Railway Workers, Prague, 1986
 Josef Hampl, text by Machalický Jiří, cat. 82 p., Gallery of Fine Arts in Most 1991
 Josef Hampl: Balance 1982-1992, Machalický Jiří, cat. 48 p., ČFVU Praha, 1993
 Josef Hampl: Sewn Collages, Hirsch Thomas et al., cat. 28 p., Gema Art Group, spol. s.r.o., Prague, 1996
 Confrontation V.: Josef Hampl, Fiedor Jiří, cat. 12 p., Polish Institute in Prague, 2006
 Josef Hampl, Machalický Jiří, cat. 16 p., Gallery, spol. s r.o. (Jaroslav Kořán), Prague, 2007
 Josef Hampl: Sewn Drawings, Adriana Primusová, cat. 4 p., GASK Kutná Hora, 2017
 Josef Hampl: Selected Works 1959-2016, text by Martina Vítková, cat. 110 p., Museum Kampa, Prague, 2017

Publications 
 Hynek Glos, Petr Vizina, Stará garda (The Old Guard), published by. Argo, Prague 2016, pp. 66-71, ISBN 978-80-257-1881-0
 Jindřich Štreit (ed.), Sovinec 1986/88, OKS Bruntál 1989
 Jiří Machalický, Vladislav Merhaut, Vladimír Boudník's Vysočany Circle, National Gallery in Prague 1992, ISBN 80-7035-043-1

External links 

 Josef Hampl in the abART information system
 Artistic Confessions: Josef Hampl, directed by Petr Skala, Czech Television 2015
 Old Masters: Josef Hampl, idnes.cz, 1.8.2016
 Karel Oujezdský - interview with Josef Hampl, Czech radio Vltava, 2011

20th-century Czech artists
Collage artists
Czech printmakers
Czech contemporary artists
Czech painters
Vysočany Circle